Ian Blair Soellner (born June 15, 1969) is a Canadian modern pentathlete. He competed at the 1992 Summer Olympics.

References

External links
 

1969 births
Living people
Canadian male modern pentathletes
Olympic modern pentathletes of Canada
Modern pentathletes at the 1992 Summer Olympics
Sportspeople from British Columbia